Miklós Szabó (2 September 1938 – 10 October 2019) was a Hungarian sports shooter. He competed in the 300 metre rifle, three positions event at the 1960 Summer Olympics.

References

External links
 

1938 births
2019 deaths
Hungarian male sport shooters
Olympic shooters of Hungary
Shooters at the 1960 Summer Olympics
People from Szolnok
Sportspeople from Jász-Nagykun-Szolnok County
20th-century Hungarian people